The Green–Reading House is a historic late 18th-century Federal style farmhouse in Ewing Township, New Jersey.  The Green family was notable for running the Delaware River Ferry, which crossed the river at the foot of Wilburtha Road.  The house later came into the Reading family by marriage.  It came into the possession of the State of New Jersey in 1911.

See also
National Register of Historic Places listings in Mercer County, New Jersey

References

National Register of Historic Places in Mercer County, New Jersey
Houses in Mercer County, New Jersey
Ewing Township, New Jersey
New Jersey Register of Historic Places